Roberts Stadium was a 2,356 seat soccer-specific stadium located on the campus of Princeton University in Princeton, New Jersey. It was the home to the Princeton Tigers men's and women's soccer teams. The stadium was named in honor of Thomas S. Roberts '85, a former Princeton goal keeper. The stadium's natural grass game field, Myslik Field, was named in memory of Robert H. Myslik '90, a soccer alumnus and assistant coach who died in 2003. The team's artificial turf practice field, Plummer Field, was adjacent to the stadium. The stadium was torn down in 2019 to make way for Perelman College, the future seventh residential college at Princeton University.

Roberts Stadium opened September 2, 2008, and was formally dedicated October 4, 2008, following a doubleheader with Dartmouth College. The stadium replaced the former Lourie-Love Field, which stood on the same grounds. Lourie-Love Field was named after Princeton football alumni Donold B. Lourie and George H. Love, both 1922 graduates. 

In May 2010, the United States men's national soccer team held a week-long pre-World Cup training camp at Roberts Stadium. In June 2012, the United States women's national soccer team held a two-week-long training camp at the stadium to prepare for an international friendly against the Chinese women's national football team at Talen Energy Stadium in Chester, PA.

References

External links
 Venue history

Princeton Tigers soccer
Sports venues in New Jersey
Soccer venues in New Jersey
College soccer venues in the United States
2008 establishments in New Jersey
Sports venues completed in 2008
Sports venues demolished in 2019
Demolished sports venues in New Jersey